Fredericktown is an unincorporated in Washington County, Kentucky, United States. It lies just south of U.S. Route 150 and is southeast of Bardstown.

First mentioned in a 1785 survey, the town was established in 1818 as Fredericksburg. By the time the post office opened in 1828, it was known as Fredericktown. The post office closed in 1911.

References

  

Unincorporated communities in Washington County, Kentucky
Unincorporated communities in Kentucky